Alamaailman Vasarat (translated: "The Hammers of the Underworld") is an avant-garde Finnish musical group formed in 1997. Their music is influenced by European folk, klezmer, jazz and metal. Though not officially disbanded the group has been inactive since 2014. The band's founder Jarno Sarkula died on 12 July 2020 in Portugal.

Band members 
The names of the band members are taken from various sources.
 Jarno Sarkula (sopranino, soprano, alto, tenor, bass and contrabass saxophones, clarinet, contrabass clarinet, various woodwind instruments)
 Jarkko Niemelä (trumpet, alto horn)
 Miikka Huttunen (pump organ, grand piano, keyboards, melodica)
 Tuukka Helminen (cello)
 Marko Manninen (cello, theremin)
 Santeri Saksala (drums, percussion)

Discography
The info for the following discography is taken from various sources.
Vasaraasia (2000)
Käärmelautakunta (2003)
Kinaporin Kalifaatti (with Tuomari Nurmio) (2005)
Palataan Aasiaan (2005, DVD)
Maahan (2007)
Huuro Kolkko (2009)
Haudasta lomilla, DVD  (2010)
Valta (2012)

References

External Links
 

Finnish musical groups
Musical groups established in 1997